Ralph J. Guldahl (November 22, 1911 – June 11, 1987) was an American professional golfer, one of the top five players in the sport from 1936 to 1940. He won sixteen PGA Tour-sanctioned tournaments, including three majors (two U.S. Opens and one Masters).

Early life and education
Born in Dallas, Texas, Guhldahl was a 1930 graduate of Woodrow Wilson High School.

Professional tournament career

Initial success, slump
Guldahl started playing on the professional tournament circuit in 1931, and won an event in his rookie season before turning 20 years of age, setting a record that would not be matched until 2013, when Jordan Spieth won the John Deere Classic. In 1933, at the age of 21, Guldahl went into the last hole of the U.S. Open tied for the lead with Johnny Goodman. A par would have taken him into a playoff, but he made bogey and finished second. After further frustrating failures, Guldahl quit the sport temporarily in 1935 and became a car salesman.

Comeback
Guldahl made a comeback part way through the next PGA Tour season in 1936, won the prestigious Western Open and finished second on the money list. He won the Western Open in 1937 and 1938 as well. That tournament was recognized as one of the world's most important events at the time, on the level of a major championship or close to it.

Guldahl's manner of play was relaxed: "He paused to comb his hair before every hole, and would forestall any suspense by announcing exactly where he intended to plant the ball."

Breakthrough at major level
Guldahl won three major championships. He claimed the U.S. Open title in 1937, with a then-record score of 281. He successfully defended the national title with his win in 1938, and was the last to win the U.S. Open while wearing a necktie during play in 1938. Guldahl was runner-up at the Masters in both 1937 and 1938, before taking that title in 1939. He played on his only Ryder Cup team in 1937, the last before a decade hiatus due to World War II.

Guldahl reached the top in golf ahead of more famous players of his generation, including Sam Snead and fellow Texans Byron Nelson, Ben Hogan, and Jimmy Demaret, who all went on to build much longer and more productive pro careers. Guldahl's 16 PGA Tour wins all came in a ten-year span between 1931 and 1940. Guldahl put together five straight seasons—from 1936 to 1940—with multiple PGA Tour titles.

Book contract and decision to retire
Guldahl was offered a book contract for a guide to golf, taking two months to complete Groove Your Golf, a book that used high-speed photographs of Guldahl on each page to create "flip-book" movies. After completing the book in 1939, he returned to the PGA Tour. His last two wins came in 1940. Two-time PGA champion Paul Runyan commented, "It's the most ridiculous thing, really. Guldahl went from being temporarily the best player in the world to one who couldn't play at all." His son, Ralph, claimed that his father over-analyzed his swing and it fell apart. According to his wife, Laverne: "When he sat down to write that book, that's when he lost his game."

In an interview with The New York Times in 1979, Guldahl himself offered a different explanation for the slump in his game. When asked about destroying his talent by practicing in front of a mirror while writing the book, he responded: "Nonsense. No such thing ever happened." During the interview, he offered several reasons for retiring: he was tired of life on the road; he wanted more time with his family; and the wartime slowdown in tournaments caused his game to grow rusty and he had little inclination to train. "I never did have a tremendous desire to win."

Paul Collins summed up Guldahl's decision to retire with these words: "Guldahl's fate had little to do with overthinking his game, and much to do with the untutored Dallas boy who once loved to play abandoned courses and baseball diamonds alone. Far more than fame, what Ralph Guldahl wanted was a nice, quiet game of golf." Guldahl played occasionally in the 1940s but then quit tournament golf for good, except for several seasons in the 1960s, when he played in the Masters, as an eligible past champion, without notable success.

Club professional
He spent the rest of his working life as a club professional. In 1961, he became the club pro at the new Braemar Country Club in Tarzana, California, where he was an instructor until his death. Among his students was billionaire Howard Hughes.

Legacy
Guldahl was inducted into the Texas Golf Hall of Fame in 1980. Guldahl was inducted into the World Golf Hall of Fame in 1981. He died in Sherman Oaks, California, in 1987 at age 75.

In 1989, Guldahl was inducted into the Woodrow Wilson High School Hall of Fame when it was created during the celebration of the school's 60th Anniversary. He is a member of the Texas Sports Hall of Fame.

PGA Tour wins (16)
1931 (1) Santa Monica Open
1932 (1) Arizona Open
1934 (1) Westwood Golf Club Open Championship
1936 (3) Western Open, Augusta Open, Miami Biltmore Open
1937 (2) U.S. Open, Western Open
1938 (2) U.S. Open, Western Open
1939 (4) Greater Greensboro Open, Masters Tournament, Dapper Dan Open, Miami Biltmore International Four-Ball (with Sam Snead)
1940 (2) Milwaukee Open, Inverness Invitational Four-Ball (with Sam Snead)

Major championships are shown in bold.

Major championships

Wins (3)

Results timeline

NYF = tournament not yet founded
NT = no tournament
CUT = missed the half-way cut
R64, R32, R16, QF, SF = Round in which player lost in PGA Championship match play
"T" indicates a tie for a place

Summary

Most consecutive cuts made – 25 (1930 U.S. Open – 1946 Masters)
Longest streak of top-10s – 2 (five times)

See also
List of golfers with most PGA Tour wins
List of men's major championships winning golfers

References

External links

Texas State Historical Association – Ralph Guldahl
Braemar Country Club – History – Ralph Guldahl

American male golfers
PGA Tour golfers
Ryder Cup competitors for the United States
Winners of men's major golf championships
World Golf Hall of Fame inductees
Golf writers and broadcasters
Golfers from Dallas
1911 births
1987 deaths